Blossom Chukwujekwu is a Nigerian actor, who made his professional acting debut in 2009. In 2015, he won the Best Supporting Actor Award at the Africa Magic Viewers Choice Awards.

Early life and education 
Born Chukwudi Echezona Chukwujekwu on November 4, 1983 in Benin City, Edo State, Nigeria to Dr I.E and Evangelist J.C Chukwujekwu, Blossom Chukwujekwu is the first of two sons. He is a native of Otolo, Nnewi North in Anambra State, Southeast Nigeria. He attended Greater Tomorrow Primary School and Greater Tomorrow Comprehensive College both in Benin City, Edo State. For his tertiary education, Blossom opted to study Mass Communications at Anambra State University of Science and Technology. where he spent a year. He completed his studies at the Benson Idahosa University, Benin City, Edo State after a brief stint at the Enugu State University of Science and Technology. While in BIU, he was President of the Association of Mass Communication Students (AMCOS) in the 2007/2008 session. He was also an active member of the popular House of Theatre (H.O.T) where he played the lead in the stage drama, Godless: The path to dawn. Blossom maintains that playing Ukemu in Godless was his eureka moment. In July 2008, he graduated with a Bachelor of Science degree in Mass Communications from the Benson Idahosa University, Benin City, Edo State. He moved to Lagos, Nigeria a few months after graduating to perform his National Youth Service Corps obligations. Blossom stayed back in Lagos to pursue his acting ambitions.

Career 

In 2009, after several auditions Chukwujekwu landed the lead role in the yet to be released Nigeria soap opera; Portrait Of Passion. That same year he was cast in his first feature film, Vivian Ejike's Private Storm alongside Omotola Jalade Ekeinde and Ramsey Nouah. Blossom was profiled on Africa Magic's Nollywood show, Jara, as one of the top 5 actors to watch out for in 2013. He was number 4 on ace Nollywood director, Charles Novia's, list of the best actors of 2013, In 2012 Chukwujekwu landed a role in Flower Girl which was his breakout movie. Released in 2013, it achieved critical and commercial success in Nigeria, Ghana, the United Kingdom and film festivals in the United States and Canada. Chukwujekwu's next block buster feature film, Finding Mercy, was one of the most anticipated and successful movies of 2013. It was the closing film at the African International Film Festival (AFRIFF 2013). In 2014 Knocking on Heaven's Door opened in cinemas nationwide on April 18. Chukwujekwu's performance as the abusive and emotionally volatile "Moses" earned him the Africa Magic Viewers’ Choice 2015 Best Supporting Actor award. Blossom's most notable film credits include Flower Girl (2013), Finding Mercy (2013) alongside Rita Dominic, Knocking on Heaven's Door (2014) with Majid Michel, The Visit (2015) with Nse Ikpe-Etim, A Place Called Happy (2015) and Ghana Must Go (2016) with Yvonne Okoro. He has featured in a handful of TV dramas & series, such as Tinsel on MNET, where he played Mr. Akinlolu Hart, MTVBASE's HIV themed Shuga, CATWALQ by Emem Isong and Monalisa Chinda, Greg Odutayo's My Mum and I, About to Wed and Married. Chukwujekwu plays the lead role of Kelechi Pepple in Nigeria's first indigenous telenovela; Taste of Love. (2015)

Personal life  
Blossom Chukwujekwu got married traditionally  to his wife, Maureen, on 19 December 2015 and separated  from her in September 2019.

Filmography

Film

Television

Theatre

Awards and nominations

References 

21st-century Nigerian male actors
Benson Idahosa University alumni
1983 births
Living people
Nigerian male television actors
Nigerian male film actors
Nigerian male stage actors
Male actors from Edo State
People from Benin City
Actors from Anambra State
Africa Magic Viewers' Choice Awards winners